Sources Chaudes is a communal section in the Moron commune of the Jérémie Arrondissement, in the Grand'Anse department of Haiti.

References

Communal sections of Haiti
Populated places in Grand'Anse (department)